Adirampattinam was a state assembly constituency in the Indian state of Tamil Nadu. It was in existence from 1952 to 1962 state elections. Successful candidates from three elections are listed below.

Members of Legislative Assembly

Election Results

1962

1957

1952

References

External links
 

Former assembly constituencies of Tamil Nadu